The InterLiga was a football competition from 2004 to 2010 between Mexican clubs to determine qualifying spots for that country in South America's premier club competition, the Copa Libertadores.

Prior to the 2004 Copa Libertadores, Mexican clubs competed in two levels of competition—first against one another, and then against clubs from Venezuela—for spots in the main competition. In 2004, Mexico and Venezuela were granted automatic entries to the Copa Libertadores for the first time. The Mexican Football Federation decided to create a qualifying league for its two automatic spots, and the first InterLiga was held that January, during the off-season of the Mexican Primera División.

The eight qualifying teams were selected based on their combined results in the Apertura and Clausura phases of the Primera División, and divided into two groups of four, with even-numbered seeds in one group and odd-numbered seeds in the other. Each group was conducted as a single round-robin league. In order to assure a more neutral environment, and to take advantage of a large and relatively well-off pool of Mexican football fans, all matches were held in the United States in California and Texas, two states with large Mexican populations. The winners of each group then played in a final for one of the two Libertadores berths. The loser of the final had a second chance to earn the other berth, as it would compete in a play-in game against the winner of a match against the two second-place finishers from each group.

The actual league champions are currently excluded from the InterLiga as they qualify for the CONCACAF Champions League, which is contested during the same time period as the Libertadores, and whose prize is a spot in the FIFA Club World Cup. Mexican teams would not be eligible for the latter competition if they won the Libertadores because Mexico belongs to CONCACAF.

Tournaments

{|class="wikitable"
!Year!!Final Venue!!Champion!!Runner-up
|- bgcolor="ddeeff"
|2004|| Carson||Santos Laguna||América
|-
|2005|| Houston||UANL||Guadalajara
|- bgcolor="ddeeff"
|2006|| Carson||UANL||Monterrey
|-
|2007|| Carson||Necaxa||América
|- bgcolor="ddeeff"
|2008|| Carson||América||Atlas
|-
|2009|| Carson||Guadalajara||Pachuca
|-
|2010|| Carson||Monterrey||América 

Note: After both finals have been played, both winners qualify to Copa Libertadores, but the winner with the best performance in the group stage becomes champion. Since 2005, when Mexico gained a third spot (dubbed "Mexico 3") to play in the pre-group stage of the Copa Libertadores, the runner-up has been "Mexico 3". "Mexico 1", who qualifies directly to the group stage of the Copa Libertadores, has been chosen in a match between the two champions of the year preceding the previous, independent from the InterLiga. "Mexico 2" is the InterLiga champion and also qualifies directly to the group stage.

Participations
América: 6 (2004, 2005, 2007, 2008, 2009, 2010)
UANL: 6 (2004, 2005, 2006, 2007, 2009, 2010)
Morelia: 5 (2004, 2006, 2007, 2008, 2009)
Guadalajara: 4 (2004, 2005, 2006, 2009)
Monterrey: 4 (2006, 2007, 2008,2010)
Atlante: 3 (2004,2005,2010)
Atlas: 3 (2004, 2008, 2009)
Chiapas: 3 (2005, 2007, 2010)
Cruz Azul: 3 (2006, 2007, 2008)
Estudiantes Tecos: 3 (2007, 2009, 2010)
Necaxa: 3 (2005, 2006, 2007)
Santos Laguna: 3 (2004, 2005, 2010)
Toluca: 3 (2004, 2005, 2009)
Pachuca: 2 (2006, 2009)
Puebla: 1 (2010)
UNAM: 1 (2007)
Veracruz: 1 (2006)

History Topscorers

As 19 January 2008

External links
Official site (in Spanish and English)

Defunct football competitions in Mexico
International club association football competitions hosted by the United States